Mpraeso is a town and the capital of Kwahu South district, a district in the Eastern Region of south Ghana, located at an altitude of 367 m on the Kwahu Plateau, which forms the south-west boundary of Lake Volta. Mpraeso has a 2013 settlement population of 11,190 people.

Politics 
Mpraeso is in the Mpreaso Constituency led by Hon. Davis Opoku Ansah, a member of the New Patriotic Party.

Geography
The headwaters of the Pra River are near Twenedurase.

Education
Mpraeso Secondary School (MPASS) is in Mpraeso .

Mining
The discovery of Bauxite near Mpraeso, announced in 1924, led to the development of the Bauxite mining industry along the Volta River.

Arts
Mpraeso is famous for manufacturing pottery, particularly for its grinding bowls: shallow dishes with strong, inverted rims and ridges on the interior used to grind vegetables using a small wooden pestle.

References

Populated places in the Eastern Region (Ghana)